Nocardioides perillae is a Gram-positive and rod-shaped bacterium from the genus Nocardioides which has been isolated from the roots of the plant Perilla frutescens from a suburb of Beijing, China. Nocardioides perillae produces the menaquinone MK-8(H4).

References

External links
Type strain of Nocardioides perillae at BacDive -  the Bacterial Diversity Metadatabase

perillae
Bacteria described in 2013